Sazlıca is a belde (town) in the central district  (Niğde) of Niğde Province, Turkey. At   it is on the Turkish state highway  which connects Niğde to Çukurova (Adana, Mersin etc.) The population of Sazlıca is 3411 as of 2011. Although very close to Niğde, the town is not merged to city because a semiopen prison is situated just between the town and Niğde. However lately some Niğde residents began to build summer houses around Sazlıca. Like most towns around main economic activity of the town is agriculture.

References

Populated places in Niğde Province
Towns in Turkey
Niğde Central District